Pam Galloway (born September 11, 1955) is an American physician and surgeon and a former Republican member of the Wisconsin Senate, representing the 29th District from 2011 through her retirement on March 16, 2012.

Personal life
Galloway graduated with a BA from the University of Chicago in 1976, and earned her MD from the University of Virginia in 1980. Galloway is a member of a number of medical committees, and was the past Chairperson of the Marathon Republican Party. She was elected to the Wisconsin Senate in 2010.

She had been facing an effort to recall her from office. However, on March 16, 2012, Galloway announced her resignation from office due to health issues in her family, leaving the Senate evenly split between Democrats and Republicans. Galloway's seat was filled in the recall election, which had already been scheduled. She was succeeded by fellow Republican Jerry Petrowski.

Galloway relocated to Warsaw, Indiana where she announced in May 2015 that she would make a bid for the United States House of Representatives and run for Marlin Stutzman's seat in Indiana's 3rd congressional district. As of July 2015 she raised $51,423 in campaign contributions, with $50,000 coming from loans she made to herself.

References

External links
Pam Galloway official campaign site
 

1955 births
American surgeons
Living people
Physicians from Wisconsin
University of Chicago alumni
Republican Party Wisconsin state senators
Women state legislators in Wisconsin
Place of birth missing (living people)
University of Virginia School of Medicine alumni
21st-century American politicians
21st-century American women politicians